Greg Gardiner is an American cinematographer.

Filmography

Film

Television
TV series

TV movies

Awards
1995 won the Cinematography Award for the film Suture (1993) at the Sundance Film Festival

External links

https://archive.today/20130125123002/http://www.hollywood.com/celebrity/Greg_Gardiner/3078418
 https://web.archive.org/web/20110725202502/http://www.onthebox.com/cinema-listings/celebrities/459798/greg-gardiner.aspx
 http://www.channel4.com/film/reviews/person.jsp?id=15309

Living people
American cinematographers
Year of birth missing (living people)